Steven Maharey  (born 3 February 1953) is a New Zealand academic and former politician of the Labour Party. Elected to Parliament for the first time in 1990 , he was Minister of Social Development and Employment from 1999 to 2005 and Minister of Education from 2005 to 2007. He retired from Parliament at the 2008 general election to become the Vice-Chancellor at Massey University.

Early life
Maharey was born in Palmerston North in 1953, the son of William Maharey and his wife Irene. He attended Freyberg High School in 1966–1969. After gaining an MA Hons in sociology from Palmerston North's Massey University (1972–1976), he was a lecturer at that institution from 1978, teaching both sociology and business administration. His particular specialties within sociology were social change and cultural studies.

Political career

Palmerston North City Council
Maharey served one term on the Palmerston North City Council from 1986 to 1989.

Member of Parliament

In the 1990 election, Maharey stood as the Labour Party candidate for Palmerston North, replacing retiring MP Trevor de Cleene, and was elected to Parliament. After Maharey left the Labour party, Iain Lees-Galloway successfully held the seat for Labour in the 2008 election. He was a subscriber of Third Way political thinking.

Maharey immediately became Labour's spokesperson for broadcasting and communications under Mike Moore. He later gained associate responsibility for education. In 1993, he instead became spokesperson for labour and employment. In 1994 he was promoted to a seat on the frontbench to replace Peter Dunne, who had quit the party. In a 1997 reshuffle he relinquished the labour portfolio and instead became spokesperson on social welfare.

Cabinet minister
After the 1999 election, a Labour-Alliance government was formed, Maharey became Minister of Social Services and Employment, having responsibility for social welfare, youth services, and the reduction of unemployment. In 2002 the title changed to Minister for Social Development and Employment. He also became Associate Minister of Education responsible for tertiary education. After the 2002 election, in which Labour was re-elected, Maharey also became Minister of Broadcasting. In a December 2004 cabinet reshuffle, Maharey was promoted to Minister of Education, Minister for Research, Science and Technology, Minister for Crown Research Institutes, and Minister for Youth Affairs. He was officially ranked fourth in the Cabinet hierarchy.

While former colleague John Tamihere described Maharey as 'smarmy' in an Investigate magazine interview, Maharey's personality publicly surfaced during the Christine Rankin Employment Court Hearing in 2001, where Rankin (a former head of Maharey's department whose contract was not renewed) and Maharey publicly exchanged insults. The New Zealand Herald quoted several exchanges between the two verbatim that were alleged to have occurred by Rankin. The court did not uphold Rankin's claims.

In April 2007, Maharey came under criticism for saying 'fuck you' in parliamentary question time on 4 April. He apologised shortly afterwards. The outburst was elicited when Maharey was questioned by Jonathan Coleman about the appropriateness of his actions as broadcasting minister threatening to complain to the Radio New Zealand board when he was displeased by a host Sean Plunket referring to a comment Maharey had made about the need for the Cambridge exam in Botswana as 'racist.'

Maharey stood down from his ministerial roles in October 2007, pending his appointment as Vice-Chancellor of Massey University. In the 2009 New Year Honours, Maharey was appointed a Companion of the New Zealand Order of Merit for services as a Member of Parliament.

Roles after Parliament 
From 2008 until 2016, Steve Maharey was the Vice-Chancellor of Massey University. During Maharey’s eight years as Vice-Chancellor, total staff numbers (FTE) increased from 3,080 in 2009, his first full year as Vice-Chancellor, to 3,213 in 2016, his last year in the role. However, over the same time period academic staff numbers remained much the same. Student numbers (EFTS) decreased from 19,994 in 2009 to 18,994 in 2016 due to a reduction in domestic students, including extramural students, partly offset by an increase in international students. Māori enrolments also decreased from 3,548 to 3338 students during this period. Over the same period, the University's consolidated revenues increased from $406 million to $489 million and net assets increased from $924 million to approximately $1 billion. However, external research income decreased from $70 million in 2009 to $67 million in 2016. 

In August 2018, Maharey became the Chair of the Board of Pharmac. During this period Pharmac underwent a period of change following a critical review. In April 2021, he became Chair of the Accident Compensation Corporation (ACC).

In March 2023, Maharey attracted media attention after the Public Service Commissioner Peter Hughes ruled that two of his op-ed columns published in the Sunday Star Times breached public servants' rules for impartiality. Since Maharey's actions were deemed to be at the "lower end of the spectrum," Prime Minister Chris Hipkins ruled that Maharey would retain his positions as the Chair of Pharmac, ACC, and Education New Zealand.

Notes

References

|-

|-

|-

1953 births
Companions of the New Zealand Order of Merit
Living people
Massey University alumni
Academic staff of the Massey University
Members of the Cabinet of New Zealand
Ministers of Housing (New Zealand)
New Zealand Labour Party MPs
People from Palmerston North
New Zealand education ministers
Members of the New Zealand House of Representatives
New Zealand MPs for North Island electorates
People educated at Freyberg High School
Vice-Chancellors of Massey University
21st-century New Zealand politicians
Palmerston North City Councillors